James Springer White (August 4, 1821 – August 6, 1881), also known as Elder White, was a co-founder of the Seventh-day Adventist Church and husband of Ellen G. White. In 1849 he started the first Sabbatarian Adventist periodical entitled The Present Truth, in 1855 he relocated the fledgling center of the movement to Battle Creek, Michigan, and in 1863 played a pivotal role in the formal organization of the denomination. He later played a major role in the development of the Adventist educational structure beginning in 1874 with the formation of Battle Creek College.

Early life 

James White was born on August 4, 1821, in the town of Palmyra, Maine. The fifth of nine children, James was a sickly child who suffered fits and seizures. Poor eyesight prevented him from obtaining much education and he was required to work on the family farm. At age 19 his eyesight improved and he enrolled at a local academy. He earned a teaching certificate in the common branches and briefly taught at an elementary school. He was baptized into the Christian Connexion at age 15. He learned of the Millerite message from his parents and after hearing powerful preaching at an advent camp meeting in Exeter, Maine, White decided to leave teaching and become a preacher. Consequently, he has ordained a minister of the Christian Connexion in 1843. White was a powerful preacher, and it is recorded that during the winter of 1843, 1,000 people accepted the Millerite message owing to his preaching. At times, however, White was met with angry mobs who hurled snowballs at him. During these early travels he met Ellen G. Harmon whom he married on August 30, 1846. James White and Ellen G. White had four boys, Henry Nichols (1847–1863), James Edson (1849–1928), William Clarence (1854–1937) and John Herbert (1860–1860).

Adventist service 

The paper which James White initially started, "The Present Truth", was combined with another periodical called the "Advent Review" in 1850 to become the "Second Advent Review and Sabbath Herald", still published as the "Adventist Review" today. This periodical became the main source of communication for the Sabbatarian Adventist movement regarding points of doctrine and organization. It also became a venue for James and Ellen White to quickly and efficiently share their views to like-minded believers. James White served as editor of the periodical until 1851 when he invited Uriah Smith to become editor. He played a senior role in the management of church publications as president of the Review and Herald Publishing Association. He also served on several occasions as president of the General Conference of Seventh-day Adventists.(1865–1867; 1869–1871; 1874–1880).

In 1865 White suffered from a paralytic stroke. White eventually determined that he should retire from the ministry and live out his days gracefully. In 1880, G. I. Butler replaced him as General Conference president. During the summer of 1881, White came down with a fever and was taken to the Battle Creek Sanitarium. Despite the efforts of Dr. Kellogg, White died on August 6, 1881.

Publications 
White was a prolific writer and publisher for the Adventists. Some of his most popular publications include:

Life Incidents (1868). Republished by Andrews University Press with an introduction by Jerry Moon (publisher's page)
Word to the Little Flock, 1847 Pamphlet
Signs of the Times, 1853
Life Incidents, 1868 Steam Press
Selections from Life Incidents, 1868 Steam Press
A Solemn Appeal Relative to Solitary Vice, and the Abuses and Excesses in Marriage Relation, 1870 Steam Press
Sermons on The Coming and Kingdom of Our Lord Jesus Christ, 1870 Steam Press
Sketches of the Christian Life and Public Labors of William Miller, 1875 Steam Press
The Sounding of the Seven Trumpets of Revelation 8 & 9, 1875 Steam Press
The Second Coming of Christ, Matthew 24, 1876
Early Life & Experiences of Joseph Bates, 1877 Steam Press
Biblical Institute, 1878 Steam Press
Life Sketches, 1880 Steam Press

See also

 General Conference of Seventh-day Adventists
 Seventh-day Adventist Church
 Ellen G. White
 Adventist Review
 Adventist
 Adventist Health Studies
 Seventh-day Adventist Church Pioneers
 Seventh-day Adventist eschatology
 Seventh-day Adventist theology
 Seventh-day Adventist worship
Millerites
 History of the Seventh-day Adventist Church
 Teachings of Ellen White
 Inspiration of Ellen White
 Prophecy in the Seventh-day Adventist Church
 The Pillars of Adventism
 Second Advent
 Historicism
 Sabbath in Seventh-day Adventism

References

Resources 
 Gerald Wheeler. James White: Innovator and Overcomer. Review and Herald, 2003

External links
 Biography on www.whiteestate.org
 Marriage to Ellen G. White
 Life Incidents at Making of America
 Adventist Archives – Contains many articles written by James White
 Original "The Present Truth" Articles – Published by James White, known later as the Advent Review

1821 births
1881 deaths
Seventh-day Adventist administrators
Seventh-day Adventist theologians
American Seventh-day Adventists
Seventh-day Adventist religious workers
American Seventh-day Adventist ministers
Seventh-day Adventists from Michigan
American Christian theologians
History of the Seventh-day Adventist Church
Editors of Christian publications
19th-century American writers
Andrews University
Lay theologians
Founders of new religious movements
People from Palmyra, Maine
American Seventh-day Adventist missionaries
Seventh-day Adventist missionaries in the United States